Beata Sokołowska-Kulesza (born 10 January 1974 in Gorzów Wielkopolski) is a Polish sprint canoer who competed from 1999 to 2004. Competing in two Summer Olympics, she won two bronze medals in the K-2 500 m event (2000, 2004).

Sokołowska-Kulesza has also been successful at the ICF Canoe Sprint World Championships, winning ten medals. This includes a gold (K-2 500 m: 1999), four silvers (K-2 200 m: 1999, 2001; K-2 500 m: 2001, K-4 200 m: 2005), and five bronzes (K-2 200 m: 2003, K-2 500 m: 2003, K-4 200 m: 1999, K-4 500 m: 1999, 2003).

For her sport achievements, she received: 
 Golden Cross of Merit in 2000; 
 Knight's Cross of the Order of Polonia Restituta (5th Class) in 2004.

References
DatabaseOlympics.com profile

Pkol.pl profile 

1974 births
Canoeists at the 2000 Summer Olympics
Canoeists at the 2004 Summer Olympics
Living people
Olympic canoeists of Poland
Olympic bronze medalists for Poland
Polish female canoeists
Olympic medalists in canoeing
Knights of the Order of Polonia Restituta
Recipients of the Gold Cross of Merit (Poland)
Sportspeople from Gorzów Wielkopolski
ICF Canoe Sprint World Championships medalists in kayak
Medalists at the 2004 Summer Olympics
Medalists at the 2000 Summer Olympics
21st-century Polish women